Stephanie Cutter (born October 22, 1968) is an American political consultant.  She served as an advisor to President Barack Obama during his first presidential term, and was deputy campaign manager for his 2012 re-election campaign. She previously worked in campaign and communications roles for other prominent Democrats including Ted Kennedy, John Kerry, and Michelle Obama. The New York Times described her as "a popular but polarizing face of (Obama's) campaign", and a "soldier who says the things the candidate can’t (or won’t) say."

After 2012, she founded Precision Strategies, a political consulting firm, with fellow Obama campaign alumni Jen O'Malley Dillon and Teddy Goff.  During the 2020 election, she was producer of the all-virtual Democratic National Convention, and following Joe Biden's victory, she was tapped to act as producer of the 2021 inauguration, which included mostly virtual festivities.

Early life and education 
Cutter was born in Taunton, Massachusetts, and was raised in nearby Raynham, Massachusetts. She graduated from Bridgewater-Raynham Regional High School in 1986. Her mother, Grace, is a school teacher, and her brother served in Afghanistan. She received a B.A. degree from Smith College and a J.D. degree from Georgetown Law School.

Career
Cutter began her career working as a junior aide to New York Governor Mario Cuomo prior to joining Bill Clinton's 1992 election campaign. She worked for the Environmental Protection Agency and the Clinton administration, eventually becoming White House deputy communications director. Cutter worked to repair Clinton's image following his impeachment.

Beginning in 2001, she served as Communications Director for Senator Ted Kennedy.

In November 2003, she was named communications director for the John Kerry campaign, at Kennedy's recommendation. During that campaign, she was criticized for having a surly and difficult personality and was often scapegoated for Kerry's loss. Kerry considered the criticism of her unfair and praised her work. After the Kerry campaign, Cutter returned to work for Kennedy.

Cutter joined Barack Obama's first presidential campaign in 2008 as a senior advisor to Barack Obama and as the chief of staff to Michelle Obama. Cutter has been credited with helping the campaign receive an endorsement from Kennedy and improving Michelle Obama's public reputation during the campaign. Cutter became a trusted aide to both Obamas and in 2009 was named one of the "50 Most Powerful People in D.C." by GQ.

She served as the Chief Spokesperson for the Obama-Biden Transition Project. She served in the Treasury Department as Timothy Geithner's counselor  where "she protected Geithner’s fragile reputation and tried to spin unpopular policies like the Troubled Asset Relief Program and the A.I.G. bailout." In May 2009, Cutter was appointed to serve as adviser to President Obama in the Supreme Court nominations. Later that year, GQ Magazine named Cutter one of the 50 most powerful people in Washington.

In 2010, Cutter was named Assistant to the President for Special Projects, charged with managing communications and outreach strategy for the Patient Protection and Affordable Care Act. In 2011, Cutter was named Deputy Senior Advisor to President Barack Obama.

In September 2011, the White House announced Cutter would leave her position as Deputy Senior Advisor to serve as deputy campaign manager for Obama for America. She has appeared in numerous campaign videos and ads for Obama's campaign, as well as a guest in TV appearances. During the 2012 campaign, Steve Schmidt, a Republican strategist, stated that Cutter is "arguably the strongest player on either side out there now."

CNN announced on June 26, 2013, that Cutter will join a new version of Crossfire re-launching in the fall of 2013, with panelists Newt Gingrich, S. E. Cupp, and Van Jones.

Besides her role at CNN Cutter founded Precision Strategies, where she is a partner. Precision Strategies is a strategic consulting firm based in Washington, D.C. and New York City. Cutter started the firm with three veterans that worked for the Obama 2012 campaign team.

Cutter informed CNN staffers on October 7, 2013, that she was pregnant with her first child. With a due date of early March 2014, she informed the network she would return to Crossfire after maternity leave. She remained with the series until it ended in July of that year.

Cutter served as the Program Executive for the 2020 Democratic National Convention.

Cutter co-founded Precision Strategies with Jennifer O'Malley Dillon and Teddy Goff in 2013. The consulting firm reportedly worked with a variety of political and private clients, including Justin Trudeau, March for Our Lives, and General Electric. Cutter was the Chief Program Executive for the 2020 Democratic National Convention, held for the first time as a virtual event rather than an in-person gathering due to the COVID-19 pandemic. The following year, Cutter and Ricky Kirshner served as executive producers of President Joe Biden's inauguration. Part of the inauguration, Celebrating America, earned Cutter and Kirshner a nomination for the Outstanding Live Variety Special award at the 73rd Primetime Creative Arts Emmy Awards.

References

External links 

1968 births
American political consultants
American women lawyers
Barack Obama 2012 presidential campaign
CNN people
Georgetown University Law Center alumni
Living people
Massachusetts Democrats
People from Taunton, Massachusetts
Smith College alumni
Women in Massachusetts politics
People from Raynham, Massachusetts
21st-century American women